Apamea burgessi is a moth of the family Noctuidae. It is native to central North America, where it can be found throughout the Great Plains and Great Basin. Its distribution extends north to Alberta and south to Texas. There is a disjunct population on the East Coast of the United States.

The wingspan is 38–40 mm. The forewing is streaked tan and gray and the hindwing is white. The flight season is in September and October.

Subspecies
Apamea burgessi burgessi (Morrison, 1874)
Apamea burgessi leucoptera Mikkola, 2009
Apamea burgessi ona (Smith, 1909)

References

External links
Images

Apamea (moth)
Moths of North America
Moths described in 1874